Taiyafeh-ye Shirzadi (also Romanized as Ţāīyafeh-ye Shīrzādī; also known as Karkūshk-e Shīrzādī, Shīrzādī, and Taqī Shīrzādī) is a village in Cheleh Rural District, in the Central District of Gilan-e Gharb County, Kermanshah Province, Iran. At the 2006 census, its population was 132, in 28 families.

References 

Populated places in Gilan-e Gharb County